"Oui ou non" is a song by Belgian singer Angèle, which was released on 8 November 2019. The song was written and produced by Angèle and Tristan Salvati. Oui ou non is the ninth single from the Brol album and is the second single from the re-release of Brol, La Suite.

Charts

Weekly charts

Year-end charts

Certifications

Sources 

2019 songs
Angèle (singer) songs